is a Japanese voice actress affiliated with Aoni Production. Her hometown is Wakayama, Wakayama Prefecture.

Filmography

Anime television series
Binbō Shimai Monogatari (xxxx) - Telephone Guidance
Shoot! (xxxx) - Michiko Izumi
Neighborhood Story (xxxx) - Kindergarten Pupil
Ghost Sweeper Mikami (xxxx) - Female Student, Villager, Staff
GeGeGe no Kitarō (xxxx) - Chisato Watanabe
Aquarian Age: Sign for Evolution (xxxx) - Chairmanship
Magical Taluluto (xxxx) - Girl, Hiker
Ultimate Muscle (xxxx) - Mari Nikaidō
Kiteretsu Daihyakka (1988) - Mami, Sachiko
Kinnikuman: Scramble for the Throne (1991–92) - Mari Nikaidō, Robin Mask (young)
Marmalade Boy (1994) - Yayoi Takase
The King of Braves GaoGaiGar (1997) - Akiko Hirata
Air Master (2003) - Masami Ishige
Shuffle! (2005) - Mayumi Thyme, Masato's Mother
Shuffle! Memories (2007) - Mayumi Thyme
Lucky Star (2007) - Hikaru Sakuraba

OVA
Slow Step (1991) - Staff (D)
Ogre Slayer (1995) - Oyone
Akane Maniax (2004) - Marimo Jingūji

Video games
CAL III (1993) - Juno
Eternal Melody (1996) - Iris
Kyōfu Shimbun (1997) - Midoriko Nakagami
Tea Society of a Witch (2002) - Megumi Yuhi
Airforce Delta Strike (2004) - Amelia Johnson
Shuffle! On the Stage (2005) - Mayumi Thyme
Edelweiss (2006) - Haruka Aozora
Muv-Luv (all ages version) (2006) - Marimo Jingūji
Muv-Luv Alternative (all ages version) (2006) - Marimo Jingūji
Lucky Star: Ryōō Gakuen Ōtōsai (2008) - Hikaru Sakuraba

Drama CD
Edelweiss: Eidenjima Kafun Dai Sensō (xxx) - Haruka Aozora
Shuffle! (xxxx) - Mayumi Thyme

Tokusatsu
Engine Sentai Go-onger (2008–09) - Engine BearRV
Engine Sentai Go-onger: Boom Boom! Bang Bang! GekijōBang!! (2008) - Engine BearRV
Engine Sentai Go-onger vs. Gekiranger (2009) - Engine BearRV
Samurai Sentai Shinkenger vs. Go-onger: GinmakuBang!! (2010) - Engine BearRV
Kaizoku Sentai Gokaiger (2011) - Engine BearRV

Dubbing Roles
Chaotic - Codemaster Amzen
Reigen Doushi

External links
Miki Inoue profile at Aoni Production 

People from Wakayama (city)
Voice actors from Wakayama Prefecture
Voice actresses from Wakayama Prefecture
Japanese voice actresses
Living people
1967 births
20th-century Japanese actresses
21st-century Japanese actresses
Aoni Production voice actors